Mateusz Polski (born 5 February 1993) is a Polish boxer. He competed in the Light Welterweight event at the 2017 European Amateur Boxing Championships and 2015 European Games

Professional boxing record

References

External links

1993 births
Living people
Polish male boxers
Boxers at the 2015 European Games
European Games medalists in boxing
European Games bronze medalists for Poland
Light-welterweight boxers
21st-century Polish people
20th-century Polish people